Victor Stevenson (born September 22, 1960 in New Westminster, British Columbia) is a former professional Canadian football offensive lineman who played 17 seasons in the Canadian Football League for five different teams. He was named CFL All-Star in 1992 and was a part of three Grey Cup championship teams: with the Saskatchewan Roughriders in 1989, with the British Columbia Lions in 1994 and with the Toronto Argonauts in 1996. Stevenson played college football at the University of Calgary.

Currently, he is teaching at Winston Knoll Collegiate.

External links
 http://www.canada.com/reginaleaderpost/news/sports/story.html?id=4303e3ac-a245-4e23-9302-fd9e2e19ad9f&p=1

1960 births
Living people
BC Lions players
Calgary Dinos football players
Canadian football offensive linemen
Edmonton Elks players
Montreal Alouettes players
Sportspeople from New Westminster
Players of Canadian football from British Columbia
Saskatchewan Roughriders players
Toronto Argonauts players